David A. Kaufman is an American writer and theatre critic, based in New York City.

Kaufman's book on Doris Day, Doris Day: The Untold Story of the Girl Next Door,  was published on June 10, 2008 by Virgin Books. The book was excerpted, in an article titled "Doris Day's Vanishing Act", in the May 2008 issue of Vanity Fair. Kaufman interviewed more than 175 people in the course of his research.

Kaufman's previous work, about the American playwright Charles Ludlam was Ridiculous!: The Theatrical Life and Times of Charles Ludlam (2002) .

Kaufman has been covering the theater in New York since 1981. A former theater critic for the New York Daily News, he is also a long-time contributor to the Nation, Vanity Fair, the Village Voice and the New York Times. His biography of Mary Martin, Some Enchanted Evenings, is published by St. Martin's Press (2016).

References

External links
Virgin Books website on Doris Day: The Untold Story of the Girl Next Door

Year of birth missing (living people)
Living people
American non-fiction writers